Deemed university, or deemed-to-be-university, is an accreditation granted to higher educational institutions in India by the Department of Higher Education. , the UGC lists 127 institutes which were granted the deemed to be university status.

List of universities
The following instituted were granted the deemed to be university status.

De-novo category 
The following institutes were granted the deemed to be university status under the "" category which specialize in a unique and 'emerging areas of knowledge.'

Note
In many cases, the same listing by the UGC covers several institutes. For example, the listing for Homi Bhabha National Institute covers the Institute of Mathematical Sciences, the Indira Gandhi Centre for Atomic Research and other institutes. The list above includes only the major institute granted the status, and such additional institutes are not listed separately. The date of establishment listed is the date reported by the institute. The date in parenthesis is the date in which the institute was granted deemed university status.

See also
List of autonomous higher education institutes in India
List of universities in India
 List of central universities in India
 List of private universities in India
 List of state universities in India

References 

deemed universities
Deemed Universities in India